5Spike was a British free-to-air television channel owned by ViacomCBS Networks UK & Australia. Launching on 15 April 2015 on Freeview as just Spike, it was a localised version of the American cable channel Spike (now Paramount Network), and became a multiplex channel of Channel 5 in 2017 when it renamed as 5Spike. It primarily aired entertainment programmes, including action and drama series, police documentaries, and programming from its U.S. counterpart, as well as mixed martial arts.

On 7 January 2020, the network was discontinued, with Paramount Network assuming its channel placements and programming.

History
Following Viacom's acquisition of Channel 5, it was reported that a local version of the male-skewing U.S. channel Spike would be launching in the United Kingdom. These reports were confirmed in late 2014, with the channel proposed to replace Viva on Freeview. The channel was operated under the auspices of Channel 5's programming director Ben Frow; of Spike's lineup, he described the service as a "driven, high-energy channel offering a point of view and program mix I think is different from anything else on British TV right now."

Spike launched on 15 April 2015 on Freeview channel 31, displacing 5USA; although it was originally announced that Spike would replace Viva entirely on Freeview, Viva was instead moved to a different channel and reduced to two hours per day to conserve bandwidth for Spike, with 5USA taking on its previous channel allotment. Among its first programmes, the premiere of Police Interceptors Unleashed was seen by 137,000 viewers.

On 31 October 2017, Spike was rebranded as 5Spike  to more closely associate itself with its sister channels and the Channel 5 brand.

A British version of Spike's successor in the US, Paramount Network, was launched on 4 July 2018. On 7 January 2020, 5Spike was merged with Paramount Network. The 5Spike name was discontinued with the Paramount Network assuming its channel positions on Freeview, Sky (including its +1 timeshift channel) and Virgin Media, and with the programming changed to reflect that of 5Spike, with more male-skewering shows and action movies.

On 19 January 2022, this male-skewing British TV channel once again became aligned to parent company Channel 5 when it rebranded as 5Action. This is because the Paramount name is to be used for the streaming service Paramount+ due to be launched via a number of Sky devices in the UK and as ViacomCBS has changed the main American Paramount Network into a movie channel (this plan was later cancelled).

Logos

Programming
The channel's lineup drew primarily from the original programmes produced by its U.S counterpart, including Catch a Contractor and Lip Sync Battle among others. The channel also aired imported U.S dramas, from modern dramas such as Breaking Bad (notably marking the first time the entire series would be broadcast by British television; only the first two seasons were shown by Fox and 5 USA, with the remainder available via Netflix), Sons of Anarchy, Terminator: The Sarah Connor Chronicles and The Walking Dead, to classic shows such as The X-Files, The A-Team and Knight Rider. Spike also carried original British productions, such as Police Interceptors Unleashed (a spin-off of the Channel 5 series), and repeats of some of Channel 5's factual programmes.

As in the U.S, mixed-martial arts also comprised a portion of Spike's lineup, with British TV rights to Bellator MMA and, under a long-term deal, exclusive rights to BAMMA events beginning with BAMMA 20 on 25 April 2015.

Original programming

BAMMA
Car Crash TV
Criminals: Caught on Camera (also known as Caught on Camera)
Fights, Camera, Action
Outrageous Stunts (also known as Stunt Science)
Police Interceptors Takedown
Police Interceptors Unleashed
Seconds From Death: Caught on Camera (also known as The World's Deadliest...)
Sewermen
Tattoo Disasters UK
Trucking Hell
Ultimate Boxxer
Under Attack
World's Deadliest Weather: Caught on Camera (also known as The World's Deadliest Weather)
World's Wildest Flights

From Spike US

Bar Rescue
Bellator MMA
Caraoke Showdown
Catch a Contractor
Cops
Framework
Frankenfood
Hungry Investors (renamed as Restaurant Rescue)
Life or Debt
Lip Sync Battle
Sweat Inc.

From Channel 5

 Bad Tenants, Rogue Landlords
 Ben Fogle: New Lives in the Wild
 Can't Pay? We'll Take It Away
 Chris Tarrant: Extreme Railways
 Cowboy Builders
 Eddie Stobart: Trucks & Trailers
 The Gadget Show
 It Takes A Thief To Catch A Thief
 Nightmare Tenants, Slum Landlords
 Police Interceptors
 Robson's Extreme Fishing Challenge
 Traffic Cops
 UK's Strongest Man
 Weather Terror
 Winter Road Rescue
 World's Scariest...
 World's Strongest Man

Imported

Airport Security: Peru
Airwolf
Animal Fight Club
The A-Team
Battlebots
Black Sails
Boy to Man (renamed as Wildman: Extreme Adventurer)
Behind Bars: The World's Toughest Prisons (renamed as World's Toughest Prisons)
Breaking Bad (some seasons previously shown on Channel 5/5 USA)
Cimarron Strip (renamed as The Cimarron Strip) 
Fail Army
Fugitive Black Ops (renamed as Manhunt: Kill or Capture)
From Dusk Till Dawn: The Series
Gangland Undercover
Helix
High Alert (renamed as High Alert: Policing the Streets)
Impact Wrestling
Justified
Klondike
Knight Rider
Lockdown (renamed as America's Toughest Prisons)
Megastructures (TV series)
19-2
Olympus
Powers
Running Wild with Bear Grylls
Six
60 Days In (renamed as 60 Days In Jail)
Sons of Anarchy
Spartacus
Street Hawk
Strongman Champions League
Terminator: The Sarah Connor Chronicles
Transporter: The Series
The Walking Dead
Vikings
The Virginian
Weather Gone Viral (renamed as Extreme Weather: Caught on Camera)
Wild Catch (renamed as Chasing Monsters)
Wynonna Earp
The X-Files

Most watched programmes
The following is a list of the ten most watched shows on Spike, based on Live +7 data supplied by BARB up to 17 March 2019. The number of viewers does not include repeats or airings on 5Spike +1.

See also

Spike (Australian TV channel)
Spike (Dutch TV channel)

References

2015 establishments in the United Kingdom
2020 disestablishments in the United Kingdom
Channel 5 (British TV channel)
English-language television stations in the United Kingdom
Television channels and stations established in 2015
Television channels and stations disestablished in 2020
Men's interest channels
Defunct television channels in the United Kingdom